Humberto Anguiano (born 2 November 1910, date of death unknown) was a Mexican modern pentathlete. He competed at the 1932 and 1936 Summer Olympics.

References

1910 births
Year of death missing
Mexican male modern pentathletes
Olympic modern pentathletes of Mexico
Modern pentathletes at the 1932 Summer Olympics
Modern pentathletes at the 1936 Summer Olympics
Sportspeople from Jalisco